Triacanthodes is a genus of spikefishes found in the Indian and western Pacific Oceans.

Species
There are currently 4 recognized species in this genus:
 Triacanthodes anomalus Temminck & Schlegel, 1850
 Triacanthodes ethiops Alcock, 1894 (Shortsnout spikefish)
 Triacanthodes indicus Matsuura, 1982
 Triacanthodes intermedius Matsuura & Fourmanoir, 1984

References

Tetraodontiformes
Marine fish genera
Taxa named by Pieter Bleeker